The New Democratic Party of New Zealand was a small political party established in 1972. It was a splinter group from the better-known Social Credit Party.

It was founded by former Social Credit leader John O'Brien. O'Brien was considered a powerful and energetic orator, but had a controversial and aggressive leadership style, and alienated many of his followers. After being replaced as leader by Bruce Beetham, O'Brien quit the Social Credit Party with his deputy Tom Weal and established his own group. In the 1972 elections, the New Democrats fielded eighty-six candidates (including Wilfrid Owen), but did not win any seats. The New Democrats won 0.63% of the vote, compared with 6.65% for Social Credit.

Defunct political parties in New Zealand
Social Credit Party (New Zealand)
Political parties established in 1972
1972 establishments in New Zealand
Political parties with year of disestablishment missing